B30 may refer to:
 Bestune B30 or Besturn B30, a Chinese car produced by the FAW Group
 Bundesstraße 30, a German road
 Lockheed XB-30, an aircraft
 Route B30 (WMATA), a bus route operating between BWI Airport and Greenbelt Metrorail Station
 B30, a spent fuel storage pond at the Sellafield nuclear reprocessing site
 Sicilian Defence, Encyclopaedia of Chess Openings code
 Tsogo languages, coded B30 in the Guthrie classification of Bantu languages
 Volvo B30, an automotive petrol engine produced by Volvo from 1968